The Eurasian Patent Convention (EAPC) is an international patent law treaty instituting both the Eurasian Patent Organization (EAPO) and the legal system pursuant to which Eurasian patents are granted. It was signed on 9 September 1994 in Moscow, Russia, and entered into force on 12 August 1995.

History
After the Collapse of the Soviet Union, its successor states had no system for protection of intellectual property. A common patent system was perceived in a convention which was signed on 27 December 1991, but never entered into force.  This system would provide for a true unitary patent that "may be granted, assigned or canceled in the territory of all the Contracting States with due regard to the invention patentability criteria provided for in the USSR legislation". The second version of the convention went less far: in line with the European Patent Convention, it provided for a single evaluation phase, but after approval, it would be converted in a bundle of national patents.

States parties
The convention was signed by 10 states in 1994, 8 of which became members one year later upon ratification.

Opposition 
An opposition can be filed against a Eurasian patent granted under the provisions of the Eurasian Patent Convention within six months from the publication of the granted patent.

Statistics 
"Between 1996 and the end of 2015, approximately 43 700 Eurasian applications were filed and 22 700 Eurasian patents were granted at the EAPO."

See also 
 European Patent Convention (EPC)

References

External links 
 Eurasian Patent Convention (English translation, archived) Eurasian Patent Organization
 The full text of the Eurasian Patent Convention (Translation by the International Bureau of WIPO)  in the WIPO Lex database — official website of WIPO.
 Eurasian Espacenet server - complete, searchable collection of all Eurasian patent applications and patents

Commonwealth of Independent States
Eurasia
Intellectual property law in Asia
Intellectual property law in Europe
Multilateral relations of Russia
Patent law treaties
Post-Soviet alliances
World Intellectual Property Organization treaties
Treaties concluded in 1994
Treaties entered into force in 1995
Treaties of Armenia
Treaties of Azerbaijan
Treaties of Belarus
Treaties of Kazakhstan
Treaties of Kyrgyzstan
Treaties of Russia
Treaties of Tajikistan
Treaties of Turkmenistan
1994 in Russia
Treaties establishing intergovernmental organizations
Commonwealth of Independent States law